William Rosenbir Garcia (March 28, 1877 – August 12, 1951) was an American track and field athlete who competed in the 1904 Summer Olympics.

In 1904, he did not finish the marathon competition. He made it 19 miles before he started coughing up blood on the side of the street. If a passing bystander hadn't found him, Garcia may have died.

References

External links
list of American athletes

1877 births
1951 deaths
American male marathon runners
Olympic track and field athletes of the United States
Athletes (track and field) at the 1904 Summer Olympics
Track and field athletes from Oakland, California
20th-century American people